Sciomesa betschi is a moth of the family Noctuidae. It is found in Madagascar.

It has a wingspan of 27 mm and a length of the forewings of 14mm.

References

Moths described in 1967
Owlet moths of Africa
Moths of Madagascar
Moths of Africa